Loreto is Italian for laurel-wood. A town in Italy named Loreto holds an important Christian shrine, which lead to the spread of the name to many other countries. It may refer to:

Places

Argentina
Loreto, Santiago del Estero, Argentina
Loreto, Misiones, village and municipality in Misiones Province, Argentina

Bolivia
Loreto, Beni, Bolivia

Brazil
Loreto (Maranhão), Brazil

Ecuador
Loreto Canton, a canton in Orellana Province, Ecuador

Italy
Loreto, Marche, Italy, home of the Basilica della Santa Casa after which the other shrines are named
Loreto Aprutino, Pescara, Italy

Mexico
Loreto Municipality, Baja California Sur, Mexico
Loreto, Baja California Sur, Mexico
Loreto, Zacatecas, Mexico

Paraguay
 Loreto, Concepción Department, Paraguay

Peru
Loreto Region, Peru
Loreto Province, Peru

Philippines
Loreto, Agusan del Sur, Philippines
Loreto, Dinagat Islands, Philippines

Switzerland
Loreto, Switzerland, a district of Lugano, Switzerland

Other
Loreto (meteorite), found in 1896 in Baja California Sur, Mexico
Loreto (Milan Metro), a subway station on the Line 1 of Milan Metro
Nicolás del Campo (full name "Nicolás Francisco Cristóbal del Campo, Marquis of Loreto", 1725–1803), sometimes referred to as "Viceroy Loreto"

People
Loreto Carbonell (1933-2017), Filipino basketball player
Loreto Cucchiarelli (born 1943), Italian former rugby union player now serving as a coach
Loreto Di Franco (1578–1638), Roman Catholic prelate
Loreto Garza (born 1962), former American boxer and light welterweight world champion
Loreto Silva (born 1964), female Chilean deputy minister

See also
 Loreta (disambiguation)
 Loreto College (disambiguation), list of schools named Loreto College or Loreto School
 Loreto Department
 Loreto Municipality (disambiguation)
 Loretto (disambiguation)
 Litany of Loreto
 Notre Dame de Lorette, the name of a ridge, basilica, and French national cemetery northwest of Arras at the village of Ablain-Saint-Nazaire
 Sisters of Loreto, a women's Catholic religious order founded by an Englishwoman, Mary Ward, in 1609
 Basilica della Santa Casa, Holy House of Loreto

Italian unisex given names